Taghramt is a small town and rural commune in Fahs-Anjra Province of the Tanger-Tetouan-Al Hoceima region of Morocco. At the time of the 2004 census, the commune had a total population of 13,362 people living in 2717 households.

References

Populated places in Fahs-Anjra Province
Rural communes of Tanger-Tetouan-Al Hoceima